Paul Yawitz (1900–1983) was an American journalist and screenwriter.

Selected filmography
 Saturday's Heroes (1937)
 They Wanted to Marry (1937)
 The Affairs of Annabel (1938)
 Little Accident (1939)
 Honolulu Lu (1941)
 She Has What It Takes (1943)
 Louisiana Hayride (1944)
 The Racket Man (1944)
 The Falcon's Alibi (1946)
 Unmasked (1950)
 Walk Softly, Stranger (1950)
 That Kind of Girl (1952)
 The Black Scorpion (1957)

References

Bibliography
 Blottner, Gene. Columbia Pictures Movie Series, 1926-1955: The Harry Cohn Years. McFarland, 2011.

External links

1900 births
1983 deaths
20th-century American journalists
American male journalists
Writers from St. Louis
Journalists from Missouri
Screenwriters from Missouri
20th-century American screenwriters
20th-century American male writers